Michael Theodore Jagosz (December 13, 1965 – March 9, 2014) was an American singer and musician and one of the founding members of L.A. Guns.

Early Years
Jagosz was born on December 13, 1965, in Los Angeles, California. While attending high school at Fairfax High, he met future L.A. Guns co-founder Robert Gardner. Gardner (alongside Tracy Ulrich) recruited Jagosz for their band, at the time were between 17–18 years old. Originally in a band together called Pyrrhus alongside bassist Dani Tull, they would officially form L.A. Guns after bassist Ole Beich joined the band.

Jagosz lists his vocal inspirations as Ronnie James Dio, Ian Gillan, and Rob Halford.

L.A. Guns (1983–85)

L.A. Guns was first formed in 1983 by Jagosz along with guitarist Tracii Guns, bassist Ole Beich and drummer Rob Gardner. Jagosz was replaced briefly by William Bailey (aka Axl Rose), after Jagosz was arrested following a bar fight. Bailey had fronted Rapidfire with Kevin Lawrence and Hollywood Rose with Izzy Stradlin and Chris Weber. Jagosz returned to replace Rose with the group recording the only material by this original incarnation of L.A. Guns, "Collector's Edition #1." Originally released on manager Raz Cue's independent label "Raz Records. The material would be re-released as a bonus disc, titled Collector's Edition No. 1, with the compilation album Hollywood Raw: The Original Sessions in 2004. The band folded after merging with Hollywood Rose in March 1985, with Guns, Beich and Gardner joining the new group. Jagosz quit immediately after the new band's formation. When L.A. Guns reformed later in 1985, Jagosz was replaced by Paul Black.

Other bands and Death
After leaving L.A. Guns, Jagosz played in several bands, including Abbatoir, Eden, and Stoneheart, as well as a band with Kurt James.

Jagosz died on March 9, 2014, from aortic valvuolopathy. His private memorial was held on April 1, 2014.

Discography
with L.A. Guns
 Collector's Edition No. 1 (1985)

References

20th-century American singers
American heavy metal singers
American male singer-songwriters
Singers from Los Angeles
L.A. Guns members
1965 births
2014 deaths
20th-century American male singers
Singer-songwriters from California